The 1949–50 Bradford City A.F.C. season was the 37th in the club's history.

The club finished 19th in Division Three North, and reached the 2nd round of the FA Cup.

Sources

References

Bradford City A.F.C. seasons
Bradford City